Global Security Initiative (GSI) is an initiative proposed by China. It was first proposed by Chinese Communist Party general secretary Xi Jinping during the annual Boao Forum on 21 April 2022. Officially, the initiative is meant to "uphold the principle of indivisible security, build a balanced, effective and sustainable security architecture, and oppose the building of national security on the basis of insecurity in other countries." Critics have described the GSI as a way of increasing China's global influence.

China issued a further statement of the initiative, outlining principles, priorities and platforms, in a concept paper on 21 February 2023.

References 

Xi Jinping
Foreign relations of China